Turris faleiroi is a species of sea snail, a marine gastropod mollusk in the family Turridae, the turrids.

Description
The length of the shell attains 41 mm.

Distribution
This marine species occurs off Algoa Bay, South Africa.

References

 Kilburn R.N. (1998). Description of four new neogastropods of superfamilies Muricoidea and Conoidea from South Africa (Gastropoda: Prosobranchia: Neogastropoda). Apex. 13: 155–160.
 Kilburn R.N., Fedosov A.E. & Olivera B.M. (2012) Revision of the genus Turris Batsch, 1789 (Gastropoda: Conoidea: Turridae) with the description of six new species. Zootaxa 3244: 1–58.

faleiroi
Gastropods described in 1998